Prentice Plateau is a nearly rectangular plateau of about  at the north side of Victoria Upper Glacier and west of Apollo Peak, Olympus Range, Victoria Land. The upper surface (c.) is ice-covered except for scoured outcrops. Named by Advisory Committee on Antarctic Names (US-ACAN) (2004) after Michael L. Prentice, Department of Earth Sciences, University of New Hampshire, Durham, NH; in United States Antarctic Program (USAP) for 15 years from about 1983 including work in McMurdo Dry Valleys.

Plateaus of Antarctica
Landforms of Victoria Land
McMurdo Dry Valleys